Ekadashi is the eleventh lunar day (tithi) of the waxing (Shukla Pakṣa) and waning (Kṛṣṇa Pakṣa) lunar cycles in a Vedic calendar month. Ekadashi is popularly observed within Vaishnavism, a major denomination within Hinduism. Followers offer their worship to the god Vishnu by fasting. 

In Nepal and India, ekadashi is considered a day to cleanse the body, aid repair and rejuvenation and is usually observed by partial or complete fast. High protein and carbohydrate-containing foods such as beans and grains are not consumed by observant people during the fast as it is a day to cleanse the body. Instead, only fruit, vegetables, and milk products are eaten. This period of abstinence starts from sunrise on the day of ekadashi to sunrise on the following day. Rice is not eaten on ekadashi.

The timing of each ekadashi is according to the position of the moon. The Indian calendar marks progression from a full moon to a new moon as divided into fifteen equal arcs. Each arc measures one lunar day, called a tithi. The time it takes the moon to traverse a particular distance is the length of that lunar day. Ekadashi refers to the 11th tithi, or lunar day. The eleventh tithi corresponds to a precise phase of the waxing and waning moon. In the bright half of the lunar month, the moon will appear roughly 3/4 full on ekadashi, and in the dark half of the lunar month, the moon will be about 3/4 dark on ekadashi.

There are usually 24 ekadashis in a calendar year. Occasionally, there are two extra ekadashis that happen in a leap year. Each ekadashi day is purported to have particular benefits that are attained by the performance of specific activities.

Bhagavata Purana (skandha IX, adhyaay 4) notes the observation of ekadashi by Ambarisha, a devotee of Lord Vishnu.

List Of Ekadashis 
The table below describes the Ekadashis and when they fall in the year.

Calculation
Ekadashi is different for Vaishnavites and Smarthas. According to Kala Prakashika, a Jyotish text discussing auspicious times for beginning an activity ("Muhurta"), the ekadashi fast is performed on a day which is not touched or ruined by any influence of the tenth tithi or lunar day. The cut-off time is 96 minutes before sunrise. If the tenth day completes just 96 minutes before sunrise, then that day is celebrated as ekadashi. If the tenth day is incomplete at 96 minutes before sunrise, but still continues to be Dashimi sometime during that day, then the ekadashi fast is performed on the following day. (Rules need to be included here by a Panchang Karta from Dharma Sindhu and Nirnaya Sindhu.)

Significance

Ekadashi (also known as Hari Vasara because it is dedicated to Lord Vishnu) is a day of fasting and prayers for all Hindus. Those who fast on this day are considered to get rid of malefic planetary influences, experience happiness, and gain the right peace of mind to think of Ishvara and attain moksha. It is a day of Vishtikarana, a day of malefic influences. Vishtikarana coincides with the second half of ekadashi Tithi and is avoided for all functions associated with worldly prosperity but for such celebrations, ekadashi Tithi should not have Dasami Vedha. Fasting should be done during Vishtikarana but the fast should not be broken during this. Vishtikarana coincides with the second half of Krishna Dasami.

Karana is half of a tithi. Tithi is the time taken by the moon to travel approximately twelve degrees of space with reference to the Sun, but as the motion of the moon is irregular, the duration of tithi is not constant.

There are seven moveable and four fixed karanas. Vishti or Bhadra is one of the moveable karanas which rotate among the other tithis beginning with the second half of Shukla Padyami.

See also
 Guruvayur Ekadasi
 Amavasya

Notes

References
Gangadharan, N., Agni Purana, New Delhi: Motilala Banarsidass, 1985, Chapter 178.
Iyer, N.P. Subramania, Kalaprakasika: The standard book on the election (mahoortha) system: with the original text in Devanagari and English translation, New Delhi: Asian Educational Services, 1982.

External links

 About Ekadashi Vrat: Ekadashi Vrat Vidhi-Niyam and Vrat Bhojan
List of all Ekadashi of this year 2022

11
 
Hindu calendar
Hindu festivals
Religious festivals in India
Hindu festivals in Nepal
Hindu holy days
Vrata